Matti Maisala (born 14 November 1931) is a Finnish rower. He competed in the men's coxed four event at the 1960 Summer Olympics.

References

1931 births
Living people
Finnish male rowers
Olympic rowers of Finland
Rowers at the 1960 Summer Olympics
People from Primorsk, Leningrad Oblast